The Provence national football team is the football team for the French territory of Provence. The team does not have affiliation with UEFA or FIFA, but are an affiliate member of the NF-Board since December 2008.

In 2008 and for the first time since 1921, the Provence team played matches, competing in the 2008 VIVA World Cup where they finished in the last place after losing all of their four games. After a losing streak of six games, the team finally claimed a first win in the end of last year, when they beat Monaco 3–2 in a friendly.

Provence put in an improved performance at the 2009 VIVA World Cup when they topped Group B before finishing 4th. They once again finished last at the 2010 finals before surprising many at the 2012 tournament, where they finished above Northern Cyprus in the group-stages, eventually losing to hosts Kurdistan in the semi-finals.

Selected internationals

Tournament records

VIVA World Cup record

External links
List of results on roonba

European N.F.-Board teams
Provence
Football teams in France
Football in Provence-Alpes-Côte d'Azur